Ľubomír Rehák, Ph.D.,  (born February 24, 1970) is a Slovak diplomat.

Career 
Ľubomír Rehák was graduated from the Moscow State Institute of International Relations in 1992 and started his professional career at the Ministry of Foreign and European Affairs of the Slovak Republic. His first 5-year diplomatic posting abroad was in Moscow as the Private Secretary to the Ambassador and Political Officer for Central Asia (1993 –1998). Ľubomír Rehák is also a Honorary Fellow of the London College of Contemporary Arts. Ľubomír Rehák is the author of the idea of the Medal of Merit for Slovak diplomacy and at the same time a co-author of the design of the award.

Diplomatic activity 

 1993 – 1998 Russia, Moscow: Private Secretary to the Ambassador and agenda of Central Asia.
 1999 – 2003 Portugal, Lisbon: Deputy Ambassador.
 2004 – 2006 Slovakia, Bratislava: European correspondent, coordinator in the field of the common foreign and security policy of the European Union.
 2006 – 2008 Belarus, Minsk: Head of the Embassy of the Slovak Republic in Minsk. In the second half of 2007, he also held the position of local presidency of the European Union in Belarus.
 2008 – 2009 Belgium, Brussels: Ambassador, Representative of the Slovak Republic to the Political and Security Committee of the European Union.
 2010 – 2011 Slovakia, Bratislava: Director General of the Political Section – Political Director of the Ministry of Foreign Affairs of the Slovak Republic.
 2011 – 2012 Kazakhstan, Nur-Sultan: Ambassador Extraordinary and Plenipotentiary to Kazakhstan and Kyrgyzstan.
 2012 – 2015 Slovakia, Bratislava: Director General of the Political Section – Political Director of the Ministry of Foreign and European Affairs of the Slovak Republic.
 2015 – 2020 United Kingdom, London: Ambassador Extraordinary and Plenipotentiary of the Slovak Republic to the Court of St. James's in London.
2020 – Russia, Moscow: Ambassador Extraordinary and Plenipotentiary of Slovakia to Russia.

Personal life 
Ambassador Rehák is married, his spouse Dana also works with the Foreign Ministry. They have 2 daughters called Magdaléna and Alžbeta. He speaks English, Russian and Portuguese and can communicate also in French, Spanish, Belarusian and Polish.

Honours and awards

Foreign honours 

  United Kingdom: Freedom of the City of London (24 February 2020)

Dynastic 

  Knight Commander of Merit with Star of the Franco-Neapolitan-Two Sicilian Sacred Military Constantinian Order of Saint George.

Nongovernmental organizations 
 Slovakia,  Servare et Manere:
  Memorial Medal of Tree of Peace.

 Tree of Peace Memorial Plaque (St Michael's Abbey in Farnborough).

Ecclesiastical awards 
  Medal of Saints Equal-to-Apostles Cyril and Methodius of the Orthodox Church of the Czech Lands and Slovakia.

References 

1970 births
Living people
Ambassadors of Slovakia to the United Kingdom
Slovak diplomats
Moscow State Institute of International Relations alumni